CITIC Guoan Group Co., Ltd. is a Chinese company. The company itself was founded by CITIC Group (who currently owns a 20.95% stake). CITIC Guoan Group is the largest shareholder of CITIC Guoan Information Industry, CITIC Guoan Wine and Global Tech Holdings.

Moreover, Guoan is the second largest shareholder of Baiyin Nonferrous.

Shareholders
CITIC Guoan Group was a wholly owned subsidiary of CITIC Group until 2014. The company had a net assets to total assets ratio of 0.00125 (around 1:799) in a consolidated financial statements as at 31 December 2013 ( total assets to  equity).

In 2014, the company recapitalized, which several private capitals subscribed the increase. After the recapitalization, the stake of CITIC Guoan Group became one of the few assets of CITIC Group that was not injected to its listed subsidiary CITIC Limited. CITIC Group also disinvested CITIC Limited in 2015.

Subsidiaries
CITIC Guoan Group was the co-founder of Beijing Guoan F.C. However, the stake was now owned by CITIC Limited.

In December 2015, CITIC Guoan Group (via Road Shine Developments and Guoan (HK) Holdings) bought a major stake of Global Tech Holdings for HK$0.11615 per shares.

Equity investments
As at 31 December 2015, CITIC Guoan Group via CITIC Guoan Co., Ltd. owned 2.00% stake in Bank of Shanghai.

References

External links
 

Conglomerate companies of China
Holding companies of China
Government-owned companies of China
Privately held companies of China
Companies based in Beijing
CITIC Group
Privatization in China
Government agencies established in 1987
Chinese companies established in 1987
Conglomerate companies established in 1987
Holding companies established in 1987